The 1908 Italian Football Championship season was won by Pro Vercelli.

In this season, two championships of Prima Categoria were played:
Italian Championship, the main tournament where only Italian players were allowed to play; the winners were proclaimed Campioni d'Italia (Italian Champions)
Federal Championship, a secondary tournament where foreign players (if they lived in Italy) were also allowed to play; the winners would be proclaimed Campioni Federali (Federal Champions)

The winner of Italian Championship was Pro Vercelli. They won as prize Coppa Buni.

The winner of Federal Championship was Juventus. They did not receive the Spensley Cup after the general boycott of the tournament.

In fact, only Pro Vercelli's title is officially recognized by the Italian Football Federation, while the Federal Championship won by Juventus was later annulled by FIGC, due to the boycott made by the "spurious international teams" (the clubs composed mostly of foreign players).

Italian Championship

Qualifications

Piedmont
Played on March 1 and 8

|}

Liguria
Andrea Doria was the only registered team.

Lombardy
US Milanese was the only registered team.

Final round

Final classification

Results

|}

Federal Championship
1908 Italian Federal Football Championship

References and sources
Almanacco Illustrato del Calcio - La Storia 1898-2004, Panini Edizioni, Modena, September 2005
Carlo Chiesa, La grande storia del calcio italiano, 2nd episode: Juve, scippati due titoli! Inter, l'atroce beffa (1908-1910, pp. 17–32, Guerin Sportivo #5 (May 2012).
Online digitalized Archive of newspaper La Stampa of Turin.

References

1908
 
1907–08 in European association football leagues